Anna Clemente (born 6 January 1994 in Castellaneta) is an Italian race walker.

Biography
In 2010, she became the first Italian athlete to win a medal at the Youth Olympic Games.

Achievements

See also
 Italy at the 2010 Summer Youth Olympics

References

External links
 

 

1994 births
Living people
Italian female racewalkers
Athletics competitors of Fiamme Gialle
Athletes (track and field) at the 2010 Summer Youth Olympics
Youth Olympic gold medalists for Italy
Youth Olympic gold medalists in athletics (track and field)